The Israel women's national under-18 and under-19 basketball team is a national basketball team of Israel, administered by the Israel Basketball Association.
It represents the country in women's international under-18 and under-19 (under age 18 and under age 19) basketball competitions.

FIBA U18 Women's European Championship

See also
Israel women's national basketball team
Israel women's national under-17 basketball team
Israel men's national under-19 basketball team

References

External links
Archived records of Israel team participations

Basketball in Israel
Basketball teams in Israel
Women's national under-18 basketball teams
B